The Kaya gecko (Hemidactylus mrimaensis) is a species of gecko. It is endemic to coastal Kenya.

References

Hemidactylus
Reptiles described in 2014
Reptiles of Kenya
Endemic fauna of Kenya